Boison Wynney de Souza (born 27 December 1996), known as Boison Wynney or simply Boison, is a professional footballer who plays as a goalkeeper for Romanian Liga II club Gloria Buzău. Born in Spain, he represents the Liberia national team.

International career
Boison was born in Palma, Majorca to a Liberian father and a Afro Brazilian mother. He was therefore eligible to represent Spain, Liberia, or Brazil. He received his first call for the Liberia national team on 2 November 2016. He made his international debut in the 0–3 away loss to Zimbabwe for the 2019 Africa Cup of Nations qualifying phase on 11 June 2017.

References

External links

1996 births
Living people
People with acquired Liberian citizenship
Liberian footballers
Association football goalkeepers
Doxa Drama F.C. players
Super League Greece 2 players
Liberia international footballers
Liberian expatriate footballers
Liberian expatriate sportspeople in Greece
Expatriate sportspeople in Greece
Liberian expatriate sportspeople in Romania
Liberian people of Brazilian descent
Footballers from Palma de Mallorca
Spanish footballers
RCD Mallorca B players
CE Europa footballers
CD Llosetense players
CD Binissalem players
Liga II players
Liga III players
FC Gloria Buzău players
Tercera División players
Spanish expatriate footballers
Spanish expatriate sportspeople in Greece
Spanish expatriate sportspeople in Romania
Spanish sportspeople of African descent
Spanish people of Liberian descent
Sportspeople of Liberian descent
Spanish people of Brazilian descent